Jim Miles may refer to:

 Jim Miles (politician) (born 1941), politician
 Jim Miles (baseball) (born 1943), pitcher in Major League Baseball
 James John Miles (born 1959), Professor of Computer engineering at the University of Manchester

See also
James Miles (disambiguation)